The bunga emas dan perak ( "golden and silver flowers"), often abbreviated to bunga mas (Jawi:   "golden flowers"), was a tribute sent every three years to the king of Ayutthaya (Siam) from its vassal states in the Malay Peninsula, in particular, Kelantan, Kedah, Pattani, Nong Chik, Yala, Rangae, Kubang Pasu and Setul. The tribute consisted of two small trees made of gold and silver, plus costly gifts of weapons, goods and slaves.

There are several supposed origins of and reasons for the establishment of the tradition: 
 According to a Kedah source, the first time a bunga mas was sent, it was sent as a toy for a new-born Thai prince who was the grandson of Sultan of Kedah himself since his kin, a princess was married to the Thai king.
 17th-century Kedah rulers considered it to be a token of friendship. 
 Thai kings since maintain that it was a recognition of their suzerainty instead.

The practice ended with the establishment of British rule in most of the northern Malay states under the terms of the Anglo-Siamese Treaty of 1909.

Before Lord Nguyễn Ánh of Nguyễn clan was crowned Emperor of Vietnam, he had offered bunga mas to the Siamese king six times to gain military support for his campaign against the Tây Sơn dynasty. Also, Sultan Mansur Shah I of Terengganu, offered bunga mas for protection from foreign powers.

See also 
 Malaysia–Thailand relations

References

Ayutthaya Kingdom
History of Patani
History of Malaysia